Old San Juan is a historic district located at the "northwest triangle" of the islet of San Juan. Its area roughly correlates to the Ballajá, Catedral, Marina, Mercado, San Cristóbal, and San Francisco sub-barrios (sub-districts) of barrio San Juan Antiguo in the municipality of San Juan, Puerto Rico. Old San Juan is the oldest settlement within Puerto Rico and the historic colonial district of the city of San Juan. This historic district is a National Historic Landmark District and is listed on the United States National Register of Historic Places as the Old San Juan Historic District. Several historical buildings and structures, particularly La Fortaleza, the city walls, and El Morro and San Cristóbal castles, have been inscribed in the UNESCO World Heritage Site list since 1983.
Historically the mixed use commercial and residential real estate in the main streets like Cristo Street, Fortaleza Street (north) from Tanca Street to the Governor’s Mansion is the most valuable in the area and it has kept its value and increased steadily through several years despite the past economic turmoils.

Location

It is bounded by the Atlantic Ocean to the north and to the south by San Juan Bay (or "Bahia de San Juan")—which lies between the city and the mainland.

The "Caño de San Antonio" lies to the southeast, where the island of Old San Juan connects to the mainland through Santurce, by three bridges, "Puente Dos Hermanos" (Ashford Avenue), "Puente G. Esteves" (Ponce de León Avenue) and "Puente San Antonio" (Fernández Juncos Avenue).

The city is characterized by its narrow, blue cobblestone streets, and flat-roofed brick and stone buildings, which date back to the 16th and 17th centuries—when Puerto Rico was a Spanish possession. Near Fort San Felipe del Morro, is the Casa Blanca, a palace built on land which belonged to the family of Ponce de León.

History

Origins
In 1508, Juan Ponce de León founded the original settlement, Caparra (named after the Province of Cáceres, Spain, birthplace of the then-governor of Spain's Caribbean territories, Nicolás de Ovando). The ruins of Caparra are known as the Pueblo Viejo sector of Guaynabo, behind the almost land-locked harbor just to the west of the present San Juan metropolitan area. In 1509, the settlement was abandoned and moved to a site which was called at the time "Puerto Rico" (meaning "rich port" or "good port"), a name that evoked that of a similar geographical harbor in the island of Gran Canaria, Canary Islands. In 1521, the name "San Juan" was added, and the newer settlement was given its formal name of "San Juan Bautista de Puerto Rico", following the usual custom of christening the town with both its formal name and the name which Christopher Columbus had originally given the islands, honoring John the Baptist.

Expansion and growth

Constructed in 1521, Casa Blanca served as the first fortification of the settlement and residence of Juan Ponce de León descendants, until the mid-eighteenth century.

La Fortaleza was built between 1533 and 1540, which was followed by the construction of a battery at "the Morro." Plans for the castle portion of San Felipe del Morro were made in 1584. Extensions to the Morro, plus construction of El Cañuelo, and El Boquerón, were made between 1599 and 1609. Circumvallation of the city commenced in 1630 and was concluded by 1641. San Cristobal fort was completed by 1771.

By 1776, the population totaled 6000, half of which were soldiers. The garrison town of San Juan included 250 acres of military installations and 62 acres of public and private use. By 1781, the city's fortifications included 376 cannon. By 1876, 24,000 lived inside the walls of San Juan, encompassing 62 acres, and 926 buildings.

Prior to the 19th century, the area outside the city walls occupying the east side of Old San Juan Island, was almost uninhabited. In 1838 the so-called area of Puerta de Tierra (or "Land Gate") had a population of 168 residents, mainly of African descent. According to a census made in 1846, the population had risen to 223 inhabitants living in 58 houses. On March 3, 1865, the municipal government of San Juan approved a resolution promoting the city expansion across the Puerta de Tierra which included the plan for demolishing the city walls along the eastern side. On May 28, 1897, the wall demolition was officially started after a proclamation was issued by Queen Maria Christina. By the year 1899, the population of Puerta de Tierra had risen to 5,453; while the area comprising the old walled city had a civilian population of roughly 18,103 inhabitants.

Maintaining architectural integrity
During the late 1940s, disrepair in the old city was evident. The local authorities were considering development proposals for renovating the old city and incorporating modern architecture on new constructions. Anthropologist Ricardo Alegría vehemently advised against the idea of razing old colonial buildings in favor of contemporary building designs. He followed the example suggested by his father, a local civic leader who had successfully prevented the demolition of the Capilla del Cristo in favor of a traffic redesign. He advised mayor Rincón de Gautier in having local zoning laws changed to favor remodeling and the incorporation of Spanish colonial motifs in any new construction. This helped preserve the city's architectural profile, and has been a key to San Juan's current status as a tourist destination.

Luis Muñoz Marín, as a senator and later as governor of Puerto Rico, supported and implemented what became known as Operation Bootstrap, which included the development of the tourism industry. In 1948 the government invited one of the organizers of Colonial Williamsburg to lead its tourism development efforts. These efforts were further supported by the 1955 creation of the Institute of Puerto Rican Culture (Instituto de Cultura Puertorriqueña) head by Alegría. He sought legal and administrative changes that would allow for major remodeling efforts to be successful. At the time, most real estate in Old San Juan had devalued under appraised values because the city was perceived as unsafe (particularly because of building disrepair and social ills such as prostitution) and not profitable for business (because of rent control statutes, as well as the reluctance of commercial banks to fund remodeling). Under combined efforts by the institute and the Government Development Bank for Puerto Rico, "model" remodelings were made to show potential property owners how their renewed properties could look. Strict remodeling codes were implemented to prevent new constructions from affecting the common colonial Spanish architectural themes of the old city. As with other Operation Bootstrap projects, mainland corporate investors were lured in with tax breaks and other incentives. When a project proposal suggested that the old Carmelite Convent in San Juan be demolished to erect a new hotel, the Institute had the building declared a historic building, and asked that it be converted to a hotel in a renewed facility. As in other Operation Bootstrap projects, the Woolworth family was invited in 1957 to reconstruct the former convent (which had more recently been a low-rent apartment building and city garage) into the luxury Hotel El Convento. The Bank provided low interest loans to remodelers, and the government gave triple tax exemptions to commercial activities in the old city (they were exempted for a limited time, not only from property taxes and municipal taxes, but from income tax from activities generated in their properties as well). At least one retailer from the shopping district in Charlotte Amalie was given incentives to set up shop in the Calle del Cristo (the city's red light district during the early 1940s) in order to persuade other retailers to follow suit and somehow "clean up" the district. Potential developers were offered sketches of their properties after a remodeling, as to suggest which architectural elements to improve or change. The paradigm to reconstruct and renovate the old city and revitalize it has been followed by other cities in Latin America, particularly Havana, Lima and Cartagena de Indias.

Historic designations

The San Juan National Historic Site was established in 1949 to preserve historic fortifications in Old San Juan. The historic site was added to the National Register of Historic Places in 1966. La Fortaleza along with the San Juan National Historic Site were then declared a World Heritage Site by UNESCO (United Nations Educational, Scientific, and Cultural Organization) in 1983. The casco histórico (old city within the city walls) of San Juan was listed on the National Register of Historic Places in 1972, and was designated a National Historic Landmark in 2013.

Landmarks and attractions

La Fortaleza and the San Juan National Historic District sites 
 San Cristóbal Castle (Castillo San Cristóbal), the largest fortification built by the Spanish in the Americas, which provided defense against both land-based and sea attacks by pirates and foreign powers during the colonial period.
 San Felipe del Morro Castle (Castillo San Felipe del Morro, or just El Morro), a 16th century citadel in the northwestern edge of the islet that provided defense against foreign and pirate attacks during the Spanish colonization, also the site of a historic lighthouse. 
 Santa Catalina Palace, popularly known as La Fortaleza (Spanish for the fortress), a former fortification and currently the official residence of the governor of Puerto Rico. It is the oldest executive residence in the Western Hemisphere.
 The San Juan City Walls surround Old San Juan and it gives the city one of its nicknames, "La ciudad amurallada" (the walled city). About 3/4 of the city walls remain intact but only one of the city gates remain in existence. San Juan is one of the six cities under United States jurisdiction that possessed defensive walls and it is the only US city that still preserves its colonial defensive wall system.

Plazas and squares 

 Paseo de La Princesa (Spanish for promenade of the princess) is a famous promenade named after the former La Princesa Prison. It extends for a quarter of a mile and runs along the southern city wall of Old San Juan. It provides views of San Juan's city walls and San Juan Bay, and it is a popular location that becomes very lively during festivals and other cultural celebrations. A boardwalk at the end of the promenade connects it to Puerta de San Juan (the San Juan City Gate), formerly known as Puerta de Agua (Spanish for water gate), the only remaining city gate.
 Plaza Colón (Spanish for Columbus square or plaza) is located in the eastern end of Old San Juan where the former eastern city walls used to be located. Originally named Santiago Square, the plaza is now a popular meeting place for locals and tourists as it is located next to famous landmarks such as the San Cristóbal castle and the Tapia Theater.
 Plaza de Armas is the main town square of San Juan where several administrative buildings such as the historic San Juan City Hall are located. A plaza de armas is a large square often found in Spanish-founded cities across the Americas and the Philippines that were originally intended for military parades, hence the name "plaza de armas" (literally arms or weapons square).
 Plaza de la Catedral (English: Cathedral Square), popularly known as Plazuela Las Monjas, is located south of Hotel El Convento and west of the main entrance to San Juan's cathedral. 
 Plaza de San José (English: San José Square), formerly known as Plaza de Santo Domingo, is located next to San José Church. It is also a popular meeting place due to its location next to restaurants and other businesses important to Old San Juan's nightlife. The statue of Ponce de León located in the center of the square is famous for being built from melted British cannons obtained after Sir Ralph Abercromby's failed attempt to capture San Juan.
 Plaza del Quinto Centenario (English: Square of the Fifth Centenary) is a modern square built to commemorate the 500th year anniversary of San Juan and the European discovery of Puerto Rico and the Americas. The square is located next to the Ballajá Barracks and El Morro.
Plazuela de la Rogativa is a small plaza located close to La Fortaleza that is famous for the bronze sculpture of La Rogativa. The sculpture, completed by New Zealand artist Lindsay Daen in 1971, portrays "La Rogativa" (Spanish for the pleading), from a legend that says that the British invasion lead by Sir Abercromby was foiled thanks to a pleading procession lead by the bishop of San Juan and a group of women carrying torches. The story states that the British mistook the procession for Spanish reinforcements.
Parque de las Palomas (Spanish for park of the pigeons), despite its name is a public plaza rather than a park located at the end of Calle del Cristo next to the chapel of the same name. In addition to the wonderful views of San Juan and the bay that this space offers, the plaza is famous, specially among children, for the numerous pigeons that live there. There are vendors who sell bird food to feed the pigeons.

Churches and religious buildings 

 San Juan Cathedral, officially the Metropolitan Cathedral Basilica of Saint John the Baptist (Spanish: Catedral Basílica Metropolitana de San Juan Bautista), the Catholic cathedral and one of the oldest buildings in Old San Juan. It is considered the oldest cathedral in the United States and the second oldest cathedral in the Americas (after the Santo Domingo Cathedral in the Dominican Republic). It contains various relics and tombs, including that of Juan Ponce de Leon.
 San José Church (Iglesia de San José) is one of the most important architectural landmarks of Old San Juan and the earliest surviving example of 16th century Spanish Gothic architecture in the Americas. The church was closed for renovation for many years and it reopened for visitors and religious services in 2021.
Saint Francis of Assisi Church (Iglesia de San Francisco de Asís) is a Catholic parish church located in the San Francisco sub-barrio of Old San Juan. 
 Santa Ana Church (Iglesia de Santa Ana) is an often-missed historical 17th century church located on Tetuán Street.
 Santo Cristo de la Salud Chapel (Capilla del Santo Cristo de la Salud), popularly known as Capilla del Cristo, a small 18th century chapel which was saved from demolition in the 20th century that has become a famous landmark and cultural symbol of Puerto Rico and its folklore. The chapel also houses a small museum.

Museums 
 Casa Blanca (Spanish for white house) is a house museum located in a historical fortification which was the official residence of Juan Ponce de León and his family.
 Casa Rosa (Spanish for pink house) is a historical house and former military barracks which once housed a museum for traditional arts and crafts. Today it operates as a daycare center and cannot be visited without previous arrangements.
 Pablo Casals Museum located in the former home of Pablo Casals dedicated to the famous composer and cellist which also contains his piano, some of his musical instruments and a media and music library.
 The Puerto Rico National Gallery or Galería Nacional houses one of the largest collections of Puerto Rican paintings and it is located in a former Dominican Order monastery.
 The Ballajá Barracks (Cuartel de Ballajá) were military barracks which now house several important museums such as Museo de Las Américas (English: Museum of the Americas), in addition to a library, music and dance schools, and spaces for cultural events.

La Perla 

La Perla (Spanish for the pearl) is a former shanty town or informal settlement located along the northern section of the historic San Juan city walls. Originally the site of slaughterhouses, the area was later settled by freed slaves and non-white servants in the 18th century. In the 20th century the community grew to become a neighborhood of Old San Juan and its reputation has recently transformed from a dangerous place into a cultural hub. It has appeared on films, literature, TV shows and music videos.

Other places of interest 
 Ateneo Puertorriqueño (Spanish for Puerto Rican Athenaeum) is a cultural institution that often hosts cultural events.
El Mundo Building (Edificio El Mundo) is the former headquarters of the now defunct El Mundo newspaper. The building is a protected historic site and is famous for its architecture.
 Hotel El Convento is a small hotel located in a historical Carmelite convent (San José of Our Lady of Mount Carmel Monastery) next to the San Juan Cathedral. The building is of architectural importance and it is a member of Historic Hotels of America.
 Jose V. Toledo Federal Building and United States Courthouse is a historic post office building located in the south of Old San Juan famous for its Spanish Colonial Revival architecture.
Patio Español Building, also known as La Filarmonica building, is an eclectic Mission/Spanish revival-style building from 1937 which has been listed on the National Register of Historic Places since 2005.
 Puerto Rico School of Plastic Arts and Design (Escuela de Artes Plásticas y Diseño de Puerto Rico) is a tertiary art school founded by the Institute of Puerto Rican Culture located in a historical building and former hospital next to El Morro fortress.
 San Juan Coast Guard Station is a USCG station located in the port of San Juan close to the cruise ship docks. The former lighthouse superintendent's dwelling still stands and was added to the NRHP in 1981.
 Santa María Magdalena de Pazzis Cemetery (Cementerio Santa María Magdalena de Pazzis) is a colonial-era cemetery located next to La Perla and El Morro. It is also the final resting place of numerous figures from Puerto Rico's history and culture such as nationalist leader Pedro Albizu Campos, Puerto Rico statehood activist José Celso Barbosa, and actors José and Miguel Ferrer.
Tapia Theater (Teatro Alejandro Tapia y Rivera) is the oldest free-standing theater in San Juan and one of the oldest theaters in the Caribbean. It is located on Plaza Colón.
 The Old Casino (Antiguo Casino de Puerto Rico) is a former casino and current venue for cultural events and private weddings.
 The former U.S. Custom House (Antigua Aduana), with its pink-colored exterior, is one of the most distinctive buildings in the Old San Juan port area.
 The former San Juan Arsenal (Arsenal de San Juan) is a historic building complex and former Spanish military installation.

Today

With its abundance of shops, historic places, museums, open air cafés, restaurants, colorful homes, tree-shaded plazas, and its old beauty and architectural peculiarity, Old San Juan is a main spot for domestic and international tourism.

The district is characterized by numerous public plazas, which are filled with local shops that sell traditional craftwork, sculptures and typical musical instruments. Moreover, Old San Juan is known for its historical churches, such as San José Church and the Cathedral of San Juan Bautista, which contains the tomb of the Spanish explorer and first European to discover modern day Florida, Juan Ponce de León.

Tourists' main spot to visit at Old San Juan is Castillo San Felipe del Morro, a fort built by the Spaniards when settled on the Island. Besides the magnificent fort, tourists are drawn to La Perla, a colorful neighborhood outside of the historic city wall.

Old San Juan is one of the two barrios, in addition to Santurce, that made up the municipality of San Juan after 1864 and prior to 1951, in which the former independent municipality of Río Piedras was annexed.

Blockhouses and subbarrios

The oldest parts of the district of Old San Juan remain partly enclosed by massive walls. Several defensive structures and notable forts, such as the Fort San Felipe del Morro, Castle of San Cristóbal, and el Palacio de Santa Catalina (also known as La Fortaleza), acted as the primary defense of the settlement which has been subjected to numerous attacks. La Fortaleza continues to serve also as the executive mansion for the Governor of Puerto Rico. Many of the historic fortifications are part of San Juan National Historic Site.  Old San Juan's land area roughly correlates to the following subbarrios of barrio San Juan Antiguo: Ballajá, Catedral, Marina, Mercado, San Cristóbal, and San Francisco.

Public transportation
Old San Juan is the location for one of two transportation hubs serving Metropolitan San Juan. At one time, a free trolley provided limited service to Old San Juan seven days a week but is not available any longer. People get around the city on foot or by car. There have been plans to turn the historic district into a pedestrian-only zone, and to either rebuild the trolley system or build a new light-rail train system in the recent years.

Popular culture 
Old San Juan is the setting for films, books, song lyrics and music videos, including the following:

 Noel Estrada, a Puerto Rican composer, wrote the popular song "En mi Viejo San Juan" in 1943. The song has been recorded by over 1,000 times by artists around the world, including many Puerto Rican musicians such as Trio Vegabajeño, Danny Rivera, Marc Anthony, Luis Miguel, José Feliciano, among many others.
 The Rum Diary, a film starring Johnny Depp, based on Hunter S. Thompson's novel of the same name was filmed in Old San Juan; the film is set in the 1960s.
 United States of Banana (2011), a geopolitical tragicomedy about Puerto Rican independence by Giannina Braschi, has battle scenes set in old San Juan, including La Fortaleza, La Perla, El Capitolio, El Morro, and El Escambron beach.
 Music videos by Luis Fonsi, Pet Shop Boys, Daddy Yankee, Ricky Martin, Bad Bunny, and Marc Anthony are set in Old San Juan. The song Despacito, which won Latin Grammy Awards for Record of the Year, Song of the Year, Best Urban Fusion/Performance, and Best Short Form Music Video. The music video of "Despacito" featured La Perla.

See also

 Timeline of San Juan, Puerto Rico
 List of United States National Historic Landmarks in United States commonwealths and territories, associated states, and foreign states
 National Register of Historic Places listings in metropolitan San Juan, Puerto Rico
 Isla de Cabras

References

External links

 Ultimate Guide to Old San Juan,
 . Retrieved 2008-04-24.
 The Forts of Old San Juan:Guardians of the Caribbean, a National Park Service Teaching with Historic Places (TwHP) lesson plan
 UrbanKibbutz (Old San Juan)

Old San Juan
History of San Juan, Puerto Rico
San Juan, Puerto Rico
Districts of San Juan, Puerto Rico
National Register of Historic Places in San Juan, Puerto Rico
National Historic Landmarks in Puerto Rico
Tourist attractions in San Juan, Puerto Rico
World Heritage Sites in North America
Populated places established in 1509
City walls
Busking venues
Historic districts on the National Register of Historic Places in Puerto Rico